Pine Ridge (Lakota: wazíbló) is a census-designated place (CDP) and the most populous community in Oglala Lakota County, South Dakota, United States. The population was 3,138 at the 2020 census. It is the tribal headquarters of the Oglala Sioux Tribe on the Pine Ridge Indian Reservation.

History
The community was named for the pine trees on the ridge surrounding the town site. An early variant name was Pine Ridge Agency.

The Pine Ridge reservation was the location of a violent shootout between FBI and activist Native Americans in 1975. FBI agents Jack Coler and Ronald Williams were killed in the initial firefight, while activist native Joe Stuntz was later shot by a police sniper. Native/Activist Leonard Peltier was later convicted of the murder of the agents and sentenced to life in prison, but there has been debate around his innocence.

Geography
According to the United States Census Bureau, the CDP has a total area of 3.2 square miles (8.2 km2), of which 3.1 square miles (7.9 km2) is land and 0.1 square mile (0.2 km2) (2.54%) is water.

Pine Ridge has been assigned the ZIP code 57770.

Demographics

As of the census of 2000, there were 3,171 people, 688 households, and 593 families living in the CDP. The population density was 1,035.4 people per square mile (400.1/km2). There were 742 housing units at an average density of 242.3 per square mile (93.6/km2). The racial makeup of the CDP was 94.20% Native American, 3.72% White, 0.09% African American, 0.03% Asian, 0.09% Pacific Islander, 0.50% from other races, and 1.36% from two or more races. Hispanic or Latino of any race were 1.80% of the population.

There were 688 households, out of which 53.9% had children under the age of 18 living with them, 32.1% were married couples living together, 40.7% had a female householder with no husband present, and 13.8% were non-families. 10.9% of all households were made up of individuals, and 2.2% had someone living alone who was 65 years of age or older. The average household size was 4.40 and the average family size was 4.63.

In the CDP, the population was spread out, with 46.9% under the age of 18, 11.0% from 18 to 24, 26.1% from 25 to 44, 12.4% from 45 to 64, and 3.6% who were 65 years of age or older. The median age was 20 years. For every 100 females, there were 100.2 males. For every 100 females age 18 and over, there were 89.8 males.

The median income for a household in the CDP was $21,089, and the median income for a family was $20,170. Males had a median income of $26,875 versus $25,516 for females. The per capita income for the CDP was $6,067. About 49.2% of families and 61.0% of the population were below the poverty line, including 74.6% of those under age 18 and 18.8% of those age 65 or over.

Education
The area school district is Oglala Lakota County School District. Lakota Tech High School is the public high school.

There is a Bureau of Indian Education (BIE) school, Pine Ridge School.

Red Cloud Indian School is a private K-12 Catholic school in the area.

Notable people
 SuAnne Big Crow, high school basketball star, leader of state championship team
 Beth Lydy, actress and singer on Broadway in 1910s
 Russell Means (1939-2012), American Indian Movement leader, activist and actor
 Billy Mills, born here, won the 10,000 meter gold medal at the 1964 Olympics
 Peri Pourier, member of the South Dakota House of Representatives
 Bobby Robertson, NFL Player

See also
 List of census-designated places in South Dakota

References

External links

 

Census-designated places in Oglala Lakota County, South Dakota
Census-designated places in South Dakota
Pine Ridge Indian Reservation
Seats of government of American Indian reservations